Keith Charles Park (29 May 1920 – 9 April 1994) was an Australian rules footballer who played with Geelong in the Victorian Football League (VFL).

Park served in the Australian Army during World War II prior to playing with Geelong.

Notes

External links 

1920 births
1994 deaths
Australian rules footballers from Victoria (Australia)
Geelong Football Club players